CGMA may refer to:

Organizations
 Canadian Gospel Music Association, former name of GMA Canada
 Chartered Global Management Accountant, a professional management accounting designation
 Covent Garden Market Authority, owner of New Covent Garden Market, London
 Coast Guard Mutual Assistance, a charitable organization of US Coast Guard
 Church of God Mountain Assembly, a Pentecostal Christian body
 Country Gospel Music Association; See The Cockman Family

Other uses
 CGMA, a former cable television channel of the Filipino company GMA Network

See also
 International Country Gospel Music Association (ICGMA), a Christian country music organization